Frank A. De Puy was a journalist and editor for the New York Times between 1877 through 1927. He was originally a Washington, DC correspondent, original member of the Gridiron Club and firm friend of Grover Cleveland. After the Panic of 1893, he joined The Times, The New York Herald, and The Tribune until returning to the New York Times.

During his career he published the book, The New Century Home Book, which was to act as a compendium for the home at the turn of the century. The book contains a wide variety of household tips and historical facts of that time. While technically out of print, this book enjoyed considerable popularity and thus can still be found in flea markets, older libraries, and sometimes on used books websites. Wentworth Press supposedly picked up the book and republished it, but Wentworth is an Australian publisher that is out of business.

References

Sources 

American male  journalists
1854 births
1927 deaths